Aleksandr Viktorovich Vorobyov (born 28 March 1962) is a Russian football coach and a former Soviet player.

Honours
 Soviet Cup winner: 1981.

International career
Vorobyov played his only game for USSR on 19 August 1984, a friendly against Mexico.

Personal life
His son Andrei Vorobyov also played football professionally.

External links 
  Profile

1962 births
Living people
Association football forwards
Soviet footballers
Soviet Union international footballers
Soviet expatriate footballers
Russian footballers
Russian expatriate footballers
Expatriate footballers in Finland
FC SKA Rostov-on-Don players
FC Rostov players
FF Jaro players
Russian Premier League players
Veikkausliiga players
Russian football managers